Brezje pri Veliki Dolini is a settlement in the Municipality of Brežice in eastern Slovenia. The area is part of the traditional region of Lower Carniola. It is now included in the Lower Sava Statistical Region.

Name
Brezje pri Veliki Dolini was attested in written sources as Pirgk in 1455. The name of the settlement was changed from Brezje to Brezje pri Veliki Dolini in 1953.

References

External links
Brezje pri Veliki Dolini on Geopedia

Populated places in the Municipality of Brežice